, son of Nijō Yoshimoto and adopted son of regent Tsunemichi, was a kugyō or Japanese court noble of the Muromachi period (1336–1573). He held a regent position kampaku three times from 1394 to 1398, from 1399 to 1408 and from 1410 to 1418. He married a daughter of Takatsukasa Fuyumichi, and the couple had a son named . His other wife gave birth to Kaneyoshi.

Family
 Foster Father: Ichijo Tsunemichi
 Father: Nijo Yoshimoto
 Wives:
 Takatsukasa Fuyumichi‘s daughter
 Hisashiboji Hidenaga’s daughter
 Sono Motosada’s daughter
 Servant (name unknown)
 Children:
 Ichijo Tsunesuke (1392-?) by Takatsukasa Fuyumichi‘s daughter
 Ichijo Kaneyoshi by Hisashiboji Hidenaga’s daughter
 Yugen by Hisashibojo Hidenaga’s daughter
 Zosai by Hisashibojo Hidenaga’s daughter
 Unsho Ikkei (1386-1463) by Sono Motosada’s daughter
 Gingen (d.1441) by Servant
 Zoshi (d.1460) by Servant

References
 

1358 births
1418 deaths
Fujiwara clan
Ichijō family
People of Muromachi-period Japan